is a city located in Tochigi Prefecture, in the northern Kantō region of Japan. ,  the city had an estimated population of 159,056 in 66,018 households, and a population density of 480 persons per km². Because the city escaped war damage during World War II, many historical temples, traditional shops and kura (Japanese traditional storehouses) remain in the city center. The city was awarded the "Utsukushii-machinami Taisho" prize from the Ministry of Land, Infrastructure, Transport and Tourism in 2009.

Geography
Tochigi is located in the very southern portion of Tochigi Prefecture, bordering on Ibaraki Prefecture and Gunma Prefecture to the southwest.  The city is located in the northern part of the Kanto plain, with a mountain range extending in the northern part of the city. The Tomawa River runs through the city center, the Oshigawa River runs through the eastern part, and the Watarase River runs through the southern part. At the confluence of these three rivers is the Yanaka Reservoir, which is used for sailboating and windsurfing. It was designated a Ramsar Site in June 2012.

Surrounding municipalities

Tochigi Prefecture
 Oyama
 Shimotsuke
 Kanuma
 Sano
 Mibu
 Nogi
Ibaraki Prefecture
 Koga
Gunma Prefecture
 Itakura
Saitama Prefecture
 Kazo

Climate
Tochigi has a Humid continental climate (Köppen Cfa) characterized by warm summers and cold winters with heavy snowfall.  The average annual temperature in Tochigi is 14.2 °C. The average annual rainfall is 1325 mm with September as the wettest month. The temperatures are highest on average in August, at around 26.5 °C, and lowest in January, at around 2.9 °C.

Demographics
Per Japanese census data, the population of Tochigi has remained relatively steady over the past 50 years.

History
In the Edo period, Tochigi prospered from its location on the Uzumagawa River, which connected with the Tone River to Edo. Envoys using the Reiheishi Way sent from the Imperial Court going to Shrines and Temples of Nikkō stayed at the lodging area in the city. Most of the area was formerly tenryō territory controlled directly by the Tokugawa shogunate; however, the minor feudal domain of Fukiake Domain was located within the borders of modern city of Tochigi.

Following the Meiji Restoration and the creation of Tochigi Prefecture, Tochigi Town was the prefectural capital from 1871 until its relocation to Utsunomiya in 1884. On April 1, 1937, Tochigi was elevated to city status.

On September 30, 1954, Tochigi absorbed the villages of Ōmiya, Minagawa, Fukiage and Terao (all from Shimotsuga District). This was followed by the village of Kōō (from Shimotsuga District) on March 31, 1957.
Tochigi hosted its first film festival, the Kuranomachikado, or, "Eizo Film Festival" from October 5, 2007, to October 8, 2007.

On March 29, 2010, Tochigi absorbed the towns of Fujioka, Ōhira and Tsuga (Shimotsuga District). This was followed by the town of Nishikata (from Kamitsuga District) on October 1, 2011, and the town of Iwafune (from Shimotsuga District) on April 5, 2014.

Government
Tochigi has a mayor-council form of government with a directly elected mayor and a unicameral city legislature of 30 members. Tochigi contributes four members to the Tochigi Prefectural Assembly. In terms of national politics, the city is divided between the Tochigi 2nd district, Tochigi 4th district and Tochigi 5th district of the lower house of the Diet of Japan.

Economy
Tochigi city is a regional commercial center, and has a mixed local economy. Food processing, automotive parts and light manufacturing dominated the industrial sector. Isuzu has maintained a factory since 1961.  In 2010, the city ranked first in the number of farming families in the prefecture.

Education
Kokugakuin Tochigi Junior College
Tochigi has 29 public primary schools and 15 public middle schools operated by the city government. The city has eight public high schools operated by the Tochigi Prefectural Board of Education. The prefecture also operated one special education school for the handicapped.

Transportation

Railway
 JR East – Ryōmō Line
 -  - 
 Tobu Railway – Tobu Nikko Line
 -  -  -  -  -  -  - 
 Tobu Railway – Tobu Utsunomiya Line
 -  -

Highway
  – Sano-Fujioka Interchange, Iwafune Junction, Tochigi Interchange, Tochigi-Tsuga Junction, Tsuga-Nishikata Parking Area
  – Iwafune Junction, Tochigi-Tsuga Junction, Tsuga Interchange

Local attractions

the sound of Tree frogs in Ajisai-zaka, Mount Ohirasan in Tochigi have been designated as one of the 100 Soundscapes of Japan by the Ministry of the Environment

Sister City relations
 Evansville, Indiana, USA,

Noted people from Tochigi
Namihei Odaira, founder of Hitachi
Yūzō Yamamoto, author
Tanaka Isson, artist
Toyo Shibata, poet
Tomoko Yamaguchi, actress
Toshio Furukawa, voice actor
Yuriko Handa, Olympic volleyball athlete 
Hirokazu Sawamura, professional baseball player 
Takayuki Terauchi, professional baseball player 
Takuya Takei, professional football player 
Shingo Tomita, professional football player 
Koji Hachisuka, professional football player 
Toshiaki Kawada, professional wrestler
Ryoji Isaoka, Olympic weightlifter 
Tochigiyama Moriya, sumo wrestler
Kosuke Hagino, swimmer

References

External links

Official Website 
 

Cities in Tochigi Prefecture
Tochigi, Tochigi